Stir Crazy is an American sitcom that aired on CBS as part of its 1985 fall lineup. Stir Crazy was based on the 1980 film of the same name. The theme song was "Stir It Up" by Patti LaBelle.

Synopsis
It tells the story of two socially awkward friends, Harry Fletcher (Larry Riley) and Skip Harrington (Joseph Guzaldo), who were wrongfully convicted and sentenced to 132 years in prison.  While working on a chain gang, they escape and set out after Crawford (Marc Silver), the man who had actually committed the crime for which they had been sentenced.  Pursuing them is the aggressive, ruthless, and cold-hearted Captain Betty Phillips (Jeannie Wilson), a female prison guard. "Captain Betty" was an amalgam of "Warden Beatty", the prison guard character played by Barry Corbin in the feature film, whom the boys were on the run from (the movie character's name, in itself, being a spoof of Warren Beatty).

Critical reception
While the movie upon which it was based had been a hit, the television version of Stir Crazy was anything but. None of the people involved in the film had a major role in this series. It was pulled from the CBS fall lineup in October 1985, the month after its premiere, and put on hiatus. It returned in a new time slot in December 1985 and a few more episodes were aired, also to low ratings. The program was permanently cancelled after the January 7, 1986 broadcast.

Pilot
The pilot for the TV series, which aired on September 18, 1985, had Polly Holliday in the role of Captain Betty and Royce D. Applegate as Crawford. Both were promptly dismissed from the roles, ostensibly because of poor testing when CBS executives screened the pilot. The sixtyish Betty turned into the much younger and curvaceous version of the character played by Jeannie Wilson, while Marc Silver's Crawford was also younger and physically different from the version played by Applegate.

Episode list

References
Brooks, Tim and Marsh, Earle, The Complete Directory to Prime Time Network and Cable TV Shows

External links
 
 

1985 American television series debuts
1986 American television series endings
CBS original programming
English-language television shows
1980s American sitcoms
Television series by Sony Pictures Television
Live action television shows based on films
Television shows set in Texas